The Seljuq Empire was a medieval Turko-Persian empire that lasted from 1037 to 1194.

Seljuk Empire may refer to:
 Sultanate of Rum